This is a discography for The Stone Coyotes, a family trio consisting of Barbara Keith, husband Doug Tibbles and son John.

Albums

Church of the Falling Rain 
1998, Red Cat Records
"Church of the Falling Rain" (3:39)
"The Mark of Cain" (3:10)
"Hammer On the Nail" (3:16)
"My Little Runaway" (3:31)
"On the Riverbank" (2:42)
"Saw You at the Hop" (4:27)
"Odessa" (3:36)
"Out of Harm's Way" (4:03)
"The Changing of the Guard" (4:10)
"Little White Lies" (3:23)
"Stealing My Thunder" (4:25)
"Folded Wings" (3:17)
"Wake Up, What's the Matter?" (3:09)
"Highway 61 Revisited" (2:55)

Situation Out of Control 
2000, Red Cat Records
"Situation Out of Control" (3:58)
"Lucky Day" (3:29)
"Where the Old Oak Grows" (3:20)
"The Black Atlantic" (4:47)
"When Parliament Convenes" (5:06)
"Noah's Ark" (3:21)
"My Horse Has Wings" (5:41)
"I Want to Rock" (4:16)
"Highland Boy" (4:51)
"Bone Tired" (3:55)
"Season of the Witch" (5:03)
"If You See the One" (4:49)
"Train to Nowhere" (6:01)
"Saw You at the Hop (live)" (5:21)

Born to Howl 
2001, Red Cat Records
"Shake" (4:37)
"Torn Asunder" (4:12)
"Detroit or Buffalo" (4:00)
"The First Lady of Rock" (4:03)
"Jolene" (3:07)
"Rock It" (5:06)
"Four Times Gone" (4:56)
"American Child" (2:54)
"Death of the American Song" (4:46)
"Bound to Burn" (3:33)
"Call Off Your Dogs" (4:26)

Ride Away from the World 
2003, Red Cat Records
"I Don't Know Why" (3:42)
"Plain American Girl" (3:50)
"Mama, Take a Look at me Now" (3:23)
"Any Way the Wind Blows" (4:10)
"Slip the Shackle" (4:50)
"Whole Lotta Money" (3:42)
"Cold Hard Winter" (3:41)
"Pennsylvania Coal Mine" (3:32)
"Born to Howl" (4:38)
"Free the People" (3:57)
"The Bramble and the Rose" (2:41)
"The Tic Toc Lounge" (3:59)
"Paranoid" (2:56)
"It's Late" (2:113)
"Face on the Train" (3:22)

Rise from the Ashes 
2003, Red Cat Records
"House Of Confusion" (4:33)
"While Unseen Angels Hover" (4:36)
"Wolves at your Door" (4:31)
"Heart of a Champion" (3:37)
"Ain't Nobody Home" (3:26)
"The Sailor's Song" (4:22)
"Rock Harder Than You" (3:28)
"If You See The One" (4:17)
"The Phoenix" (3:47)
"Bang Bang Bang Bang" (2:47)
"Your Hour to Sing" (4:43)
"Thunder On The Left" (4:13)
"Adriana" (4:42)

Fire it Up 
2005, Red Cat Records
"All Dressed Up" (3:39)
"Rock On" (4:05)
"The Valley of Regret" (5:06)
"Fire It Up" (3:57)
"Rectified" (4:43)
"Stars in her Eyes" (3:19)
"The Ghost of Vicksburg" (4:02)
"The Girls of America" (3:40)
"No Turning Back" (3:34)
"Dance Band" (5:05)
"So Long, I'm Gone, Goodbye" (2:43)
"Wake Up, What's the Matter?" (acoustic) (3:56)

Dreams of Glory 
2006, Red Cat Records
"Party Down the Hall" (4:44)
"Blue Mountain" (4:22)
"Desperate Times" (3:29)
"Dreams of Glory" (3:28)
"Johnny Rock's Cantina" (3:46)
"Back to New York" (3:51)
"Bad Luck" (4:11)
"Streets of Laredo" (4:09)
"Ace of Spades" (2:59)
"Peace of Mind" (4:59)
"Digging for Gold" (4:26)
"Any Way the Wind Blows (re-mix)" (4:03)
"Whole Lotta Money (live)" (4:18)
"Hammer on the Nail (live)" (3:35)

VIII 
2008, Red Cat Records
"Tomorrow is Another Day" (3:24)
"Land of the Living" (4:55)
"Not Right Now" (4:39)
"The Lights of Home" (3:41)
"All For Angelina" (4:32)
"That Beat's Got a Hold on Me" (4:37)
"Trouble Down in Texas" (4:05)
"Brand New Car" (4:44)
"A Charmed Life" (3:40)
"If I Knew How to Dance" (2:53)
"Kern River" (4:07)
"The Grey Robe of the Rain" (3:51)

A Rude Awakening 
2009, Red Cat Records
"A Rude Awakening" (3:46)
"The Ones Who Rocked and Rolled" (4:04)
"Might Have Been Memphis" (4:07)
"The River's Mouth" (4:33)
"Creepin' Like a Cat" (3:55)
"Reunited" (4:53)
"Thunder on the Left (remake)" (3:58)
"I Wanna Be a Punk Again" (2:59)
"What a Pity" (4:06)
"Never Say Die" (3:49)
"A Deep and Abiding Love" (4:39)

My Turn 
2010, Red Cat Records
"My Turn" (4:26)
"The Boy From the Rodeo" (4:57)
"I Sympathize With You" (4:37)
"Ship of Fools" (3:59)
"Threw a Rock in the River" (4:15)
"Set the Wheels in Motion" (2:57)
"Almost Sounds Like California" (4:18)
"Disturbia" (4:38)
"Spin Around the Sun" (3:08)
"Roses and Bones" (3:20)

A Wild Bird Flying 
2012, Red Cat Records
"A Wild Bird Flying" (3:53)
"Powder Keg" (3:38)
"Your Fall from Grace" (4:28)
"Sing Me a Hymn" (4:31)
"Close to the Bone" (4:17)
"Red Letter Day" (4:07)
"A Dangerous Game" (4:15)
"Big Bad Wolf" (4:03)
"Goin' Down for the Third Time" (3:39)
"You Got Rolled" (3:01)

References

Rock music group discographies
Discographies of American artists